Kemaluddin Hossain (31 March 1923 – 21 August 2013) was a Bangladeshi jurist who served as the third Chief Justice of Bangladesh from 1 February 1978 until 11 April 1982. He was a chairman of Bangladesh Law Commission.

Early life and career
Hossain was born on 31 March 1923 in Kolkata. He graduated from St. Xavier's College, Kolkata in 1945. He completed his law degree from Calcutta University's Law college. He passed the Chamber's examination from the Calcutta High Court and was awarded the Sir Rashbehary Ghosh Memorial medal. He migrated to East Pakistan (present-day Bangladesh) after the 1950 riot. He died on 21 August 2013 at the age of 90.

Personal life
In 1953, Hossain married Sultana Begum whose family had migrated from Jalpaiguri district, West Bengal.

References

1923 births
2013 deaths
People from Kolkata
Supreme Court of Bangladesh justices
Chief justices of Bangladesh